Cambridge is a village in Henry County, Illinois, United States. The population was 2,160 at the 2010 census, down from 2,180 in 2000. It is the county seat of Henry County.

History
Before 1843, the land where Cambridge is currently located was the private property of a man named Rev. Ithamar Pillsbury, who was very well known amongst the Yankee settlers (migrants from New England and upstate New York who were descended from the English Puritans who settled New England in the 1600s) who were moving to Henry County in large numbers at that time.  Reverend Pillsbury deeded a large portion of his land to the town council and they immediately agreed it was a good place to lay out a town.  Lots were sold to incoming migrants and on June 9 of 1843 (after some quarreling among the town founders about how to finance it) construction began on the town.  Roads were laid out, post routes established, public buildings erected and people were invited to move there.  The original settlers were entirely of New England origins or were Yankees from upstate New York whose families had moved to that place from New England only one generation earlier, in the aftermath of the Revolutionary War.  This resulted in Henry County being culturally very contiguous with early New England culture.

Geography

Demographics

At the 2000 census there were 2,180 people, 856 households, and 595 families in the village. The racial makeup of the village was 98.17% White, 0.78% African American, 0.18% Native American, 0.32% Asian, 0.05% Pacific Islander, and 0.50% from two or more races. Hispanic or Latino of any race were 0.46%.

Of the 856 households 31.5% had children under the age of 18 living with them, 57.5% were married couples living together, 8.9% had a female householder with no husband present, and 30.4% were non-families. 26.2% of households were one person and 14.0% were one person aged 65 or older.  The average household size was 2.45 and the average family size was 2.95.

The age distribution was 24.6% under the age of 18, 9.8% from 18 to 24, 27.9% from 25 to 44, 21.7% from 45 to 64, and 15.9% 65 or older.  The median age was 38 years. For every 100 females, there were 101.7 males.  For every 100 females age 18 and over, there were 99.0 males.

The median household income was $38,636 and the median family income  was $46,786. Males had a median income of $31,442 versus $20,129 for females. The per capita income for the village was $17,842.  About 8.1% of families and 10.3% of the population were below the poverty line, including 16.5% of those under age 18 and 4.9% of those age 65 or over.
2010 Census
According to the 2020 census, the population was 2,086.  Of this, 2,077 (96.16%) were White, 35 (1.62%) were black or African American, 26 (1.20%) were two or more races, 13 (0.60%) were Asian, 7 (0.32) were American Indian or Alaska Native, 2 (0.09%) were some other race.  45 (2.08%) were Hispanic or Latino (of any race)

Court House
As the county seat of Henry County, Illinois, Cambridge hosts the county government. The Henry County Court House, designed by Thomas J. Tolan & Son, Architects, of Fort Wayne, Indiana (1875–1878), is the key architectural landmark of the village. The courthouse was listed on the National Register of Historic Places in 2004.

Schools 
Cambridge has a single school district, School District #227, which includes a single elementary school, junior high (attached to the high school), and high school. The high school graduates around 50-60 students annually.  Like many small towns, the cultural life of the community revolves around the arts and sports related to the school. The elementary school was selected as a 2006 Blue Ribbon School, part of the No Child Left Behind Act. It was one of only 18 selected in Illinois.

Links to Bishop Hill
Historically, Cambridge has been linked to nearby Bishop Hill, Illinois.  Bishop Hill was founded in 1846 by a sect of Swedish immigrants led by their prophet, Erik Janson.  For several years, local Americans and their Swedish neighbors traded and lived in peace.  In 1850, Erik Janson was murdered by a former follower in the court house in Cambridge.  The historic record reveals some tension between the Swedes in Bishop Hill and the residents of Cambridge.  Additionally, the influx of Swedish immigrants attracted additional immigrants from Sweden to the Henry County area.  As the population grew, they called for religious leadership from the Lutheran Church of Sweden, an official branch of the Swedish government.

Before they fled from Sweden, Erik Janson and his followers had a contentious break from the Lutheran Church.  The Cambridge Lutheran church was established as an offshoot of Lars Paul Esbjörn's Augustana Lutheran Church in nearby Andover, Illinois.  This religious-related tension would remain between the Augustana Lutherans (including Augustana College in Rock Island, Illinois) and the people of Bishop Hill well into the late 20th century.  For more information on Cambridge's relationship with Bishop Hill see Troy Swanson's "Those Crazy Swedes: Outside Influence on the Bishop Hill Colony" in Nobler things to View: Collected Essays on the Erik-Janssonists published by the Bishop Hill Heritage Association in 1998.

Notable people 

 Dan Halldorson, former PGA golfer
 John P. Hand, Chief Justice of the Illinois Supreme Court
 John Hughes (lawman), likely inspiration for The Lone Ranger
 George Allen Neeves, member of the Wisconsin State Assembly
 Brian Phelps 25-year radio host of Los Angeles-based "Mark and Brian Show"
 Charles F. Wennerstrum, lawyer and justice on the Iowa Supreme Court

See also
Illinois Route 81
Illinois Route 82

References
https://www.cambridgeil.org/index.asp?SEC=3992A7A7-584E-431C-856B-ADE840F11C6C&Type=B_DIR

External links
Cambridge official Web site
Henry County Official Web site

 
Villages in Henry County, Illinois
Villages in Illinois
County seats in Illinois